The Church of All Saints in Kingsdon, Somerset, England was built in the 13th century. It is a Grade II* listed building.

History

Parts if the church date from the 13th century, although it has been renovated and revised many times since particularly in the 15th century when the west tower was added replacing one at the north of the building. It underwent a Victorian restoration in 1869 and further work in 1906.

The parish is one of five in the benefice of 'Somerton with Compton Dundon, The Charltons and Kingsdon'.

Architecture

The stone building has hamstone dressings and a slate roof. It has a cruciform plan with chancel, north transept and nave.

The four-stage tower  has six bells and a clock which has no face, but has recently been restored to chime the hours. The oldest of the bells was cast in the 14th century and recast in 1951. The tower is supported by corner buttresses.

The interior includes a pulpit from 1627 and a 13th-century font. There is a hamstone effigy of a cross-legged knight under the north window.

See also  
 List of ecclesiastical parishes in the Diocese of Bath and Wells

References

Grade II* listed buildings in South Somerset
Grade II* listed churches in Somerset
Church of England church buildings in South Somerset